The Group of the Independent Deputies (Albanian: Grupi i Deputetëve të Pavarur) also known as GDP were a parliamentary group in the Assembly of the Republic of Kosovo made up of former members of the Vetëvendosje movement (LV). Dardan Sejdiu was the head of the parliamentary group. 

On 4 May 2018, GDP dissolved into the Social Democratic Party of Kosovo.

Members of Parliament

GDP was represented in the Assembly of the Republic of Kosovo by 12 MP's:

 Dardan Sejdiu
 Aida Dërguti
 Visar Ymeri
 Faton Topalli
 Fisnik Ismaili
 Dukagjin Gorani
 Driton Çaushi
 Frashër Krasniqi
 Dardan Molliqaj
 Besa Baftiu
 Salih Salihu
 Shqipe Pantina

References

Government of Kosovo
Political parties in Kosovo
Albanian nationalism in Kosovo
Social democratic parties in Kosovo